Porto dos Milagres (English: Port of Miracles) is a Brazilian telenovela that was produced and aired by TV Globo from 5 February to 29 September 2001, totaling 203 chapters.

It is written by Aguinaldo Silva and Ricardo Linhares with the collaboration of Filipe Miguez, Maria Elisa Berredo, Nelson Nadotti and Gloria Barreto. It is loosely based on two works written by Jorge Amado: Sea of Death and The Discovery of America by the Turks.

It stars Marcos Palmeira, Flávia Alessandra, Antônio Fagundes, Cássia Kis, Luíza Tomé, Leonardo Brício, Camila Pitanga and Arlete Salles.

Plot 
Félix Guerrero is illegally selling part of the land his father's inheritance left to him and his twin brother Bartolomeu. The police finds out, and Félix and his wife Adma are fugitives in Spain. While on the run, a gypsy prophesies that Félix will cross the sea and become king. Thinking that this prediction could only occur in Bolivia, they visit the country without any success. Then they go to Rondônia, more precisely the city of Porto Velho. Félix and Adma discover a newspaper report that Bartolomeu became the most important and powerful man in the city of Porto dos Milagres, located on the coast of Bahia. To get rid of Bartolomeu, Adma goes to Porto dos Milagres and poisons him, making Félix take the place of his brother.

Félix becomes king. However, a prostitute named Arlete, knocks on Félix's door with Bartolomeu's newborn son. Arlete is received by Adma who has been living in the town. To get rid of the legitimate heir, Adma orders Eriberto, her foreman, to put an end to Arlete and the baby. Eriberto takes a boat with Arlete and the baby at the same time that fisherman Frederico and his wife Eulália, about to give birth, are on another boat, sailing in search of a doctor. Arlete realizes the coldness of Eriberto, causing her to put the baby in a basket in the water. Eriberto kills Arlete and, when he is about to get rid of the baby, a wave stops him, capsizing the boat. The basket with the child is guided to Frederico and Eulália's boat. Eulalia's baby is born dead. Frederico, in turn, hears the baby crying in the basket in the sea and picks him up. Eulália, thinking it is her son, names the baby Gumercindo and passes away.

Years later, Gumercindo is a fisherman respected by all in his community. He meets Livia, the girlfriend of Alexandre Guerrero, Félix and Adma's son. Livia and Gumercindo fall in love, but their love is threatened by the sensual Esmeralda, who is crazy in love with Gumercindo. Gumercindo becomes Félix's main enemy when the latter is elected mayor of Porto dos Milagres. Félix does not suspect that Guma is his nephew and that he threatens his throne, as the gypsy had prophesied years before.

Cast
 Marcos Palmeira as Gumercindo Vieira "Guma"
 Flávia Alessandra as Lívia Proença de Assunção
 Antônio Fagundes as Félix Guerrero and Bartolomeu Guerrero
 Cássia Kiss as Adma Guerrero
 Luíza Tomé as Rosa Palmeirão
 Leonardo Brício as Alexandre Guerrero
 Arlete Salles as Augusta Eugênia Proença de Assunção
 Nathalia Timberg as Ondina
 José de Abreu as Eriberto
 Zezé Polessa as Amapola Ferraço
 Joana Fomm as Rita
 Tonico Pereira as Francisco "Chico" Vieira
 Camila Pitanga as Esmeralda
 Marcelo Serrado as Rodolfo Augusto Proença de Assunção
 Carla Marins as Judite dos Reis
 Louise Cardoso as Maria Leontina
 Eduardo Galvão as Otacílio Ferraço
 Paloma Duarte as Dulce
 Kadu Moliterno as Dr. Rodrigo
 Fulvio Stefanini as Osvaldo
 Flávio Galvão as Deodato
 Cláudia Alencar as Epifânia
 Mônica Carvalho as Maria do Socorro "Socorrinho"
 Júlia Lemmertz as Genésia
 Vladimir Brichta as Ezequiel
 Bárbara Borges as Luíza
 Roberto Bomtempo as Jacques
 Zezé Motta as Mãe Ricardina
 Taís Araújo as Selminha Aluada
 Miguel Thiré as Alfredo Henrique
 Sérgio Menezes as Rufino
 Daniela Faria as Haydée Caolha
 Guilherme Piva as Alfeu
 Marcélia Cartaxo as Quirina
 Cláudio Corrêa e Castro as Seu Babau
 Renata Castro Barbosa as Bela
 Camilla Farias as Ana Beatriz

Guest stars 
 Glória Menezes as Dona Coló
 Lima Duarte as Senator Victório Vianna
 Ary Fontoura as Deputy Pitágoras Williams Mackienzie
 Débora Duarte as Olímpia
 Eloísa Mafalda as Celeste Marabás
 Sandra Pêra as Eunice
 Letícia Sabatella as Arlete Palmeirão
 Hugo Carvana as Delegado Gouvêia
 Reginaldo Faria as Coronel Jurandir de Freitas
 Cristiana Oliveira as Eulália 
 Maurício Mattar as Frederico 
 Carolina Kasting as Laura Proença
 Tuca Andrada as Leôncio
 Ilva Niño as Valdenice
 Luíza Curvo as Cecília Palmeirão
 Eunice Muñoz as Gipsy

External links
 

2001 Brazilian television series debuts
2001 Brazilian television series endings
2001 telenovelas
TV Globo telenovelas
Brazilian telenovelas
Portuguese-language telenovelas
Television shows based on Brazilian novels